Midway: The Battle that Doomed Japan is a 1989 video game published by General Quarters Software.

Gameplay
Midway: The Battle that Doomed Japan is a game in which an operational level simulation of the Battle of Midway is played. The game includes all surface ships from destroyer upwards  and the play map reaches from the Japanese mainland to Pearl Harbor.

Reception
Lt. H. E. Dille reviewed the game for Computer Gaming World, and stated that "Overall, General Quarters Software has succeeded in providing war gamers an inexpensive way to strive for a miracle. Midway is a fine achievement for the fledging firm, offering challenging (if not balanced) game play, smooth operation, adequate graphics, and a very strong computer opponent. It is certainly worth the purchase price."

References

External links
Article

1989 video games
Apple II games
Computer wargames
DOS games
Naval video games
Pacific War video games
Turn-based strategy video games
Video games developed in the United States
Video games set in the United States